Herbert Sydney Green (17 December 1920 – 16 February 1999) was a British–Australian physicist. Green was a doctoral student of the Nobel Laureate Max Born at Edinburgh, with whom he was involved in the development of the modern kinetic theory. Green is the letter "G" in the BBGKY hierarchy. He is often credited for the development of parastatistics, one of several alternatives to the better known particle statistics models.

Education
Born in Ipswich, England, he graduated with a PhD from the University of Edinburgh in 1947 with a thesis entitled A Unitary Quantum Electrodynamics.

Career
From 1950 to 1951 Green worked as a professor at the Dublin Institute for Advanced Studies in the school of Theoretical Physics. From 1951 till his death in 1999, Green lectured mathematical physics at the University of Adelaide, Australia.

Personal life
Green is survived by wife Marie-Louise Green and children Johanne Green and Roy Green (dean of several management schools around the world, including NUIG, Ireland and MGSM, Sydney).

Books by Green
 
H.S. Green, Information Theory and Quantum Physics: Physical Foundations for Understanding the Conscious Process, Springer, 2000, .
H.S. Green, The Molecular Theory of Fluids, North-Holland, (Amsterdam 1952)

References

Peter Szekeres, "Mathematical physics at The University of Adelaide," Report on Mathematical Physics, 57(1), 2006, pp. 3–11.
Re-published

External links
 Reference to Green in the memoirs of J.C. Ward
 

1920 births
1999 deaths
Alumni of the University of Edinburgh
British physicists
Fellows of the Australian Academy of Science
20th-century British mathematicians
Academics of the Dublin Institute for Advanced Studies